Christopher Patrick Conroy (born July 22, 1974) is an American Major League Baseball (MLB) umpire.  He made his MLB debut on September 29, 2010. His uniform number is 98.  Conroy was officially added to the full-time staff of MLB umpires on June 14, 2013, replacing Brian Runge. He was promoted to crew chief in 2023.

Career
Conroy was the first base umpire on August 24, 2012, when Adrián Beltré of the Texas Rangers hit for the cycle against the Minnesota Twins.

He was the first base umpire on September 28, 2012, when Homer Bailey of the Cincinnati Reds no-hit the Pittsburgh Pirates.

Conroy served as one of three MLB umpire representatives for the November 2014 MLB Japan All-Star Series.

See also 

 List of Major League Baseball umpires

References

1974 births
Living people
Major League Baseball umpires
People from North Adams, Massachusetts
Baseball people from Massachusetts
Sportspeople from Berkshire County, Massachusetts